Mesopherna is a genus of moths belonging to the family Tineidae.

Erechthias epomadia was formerly placed here too.

References

Tineidae
Tineidae genera